The  NorthPort Batang Pier season was the ninth season of the franchise in the Philippine Basketball Association (PBA).

Key dates
March 14: The PBA Season 46 draft was held at the TV5 Media Center in Mandaluyong.

Draft picks

Special draft

Regular draft

Roster

Philippine Cup

Eliminations

Standings

Game log

|-bgcolor=ffcccc
| 1
| July 16
| Meralco
| L 63–85
| Sidney Onwubere (13)
| Bolick, Malonzo (9)
| Bolick, Ferrer (3)
| Ynares Sports Arena
| 0–1
|-bgcolor=ccffcc
| 2
| July 21
| Phoenix
| W 115–79
| Bolick, Ferrer, Rike (20)
| Ferrer, Onwubere (9)
| Robert Bolick (11)
| Ynares Sports Arena
| 1–1
|-bgcolor=ffcccc
| 3
| July 25
| San Miguel
| L 86–88
| Greg Slaughter (23)
| Greg Slaughter (17)
| Robert Bolick (6)
| Ynares Sports Arena
| 1–2
|-bgcolor=ffcccc
| 4
| July 30
| Barangay Ginebra
| L 85–87
| Robert Bolick (23)
| Greg Slaughter (14)
| Robert Bolick (4)
| Ynares Sports Arena
| 1–3

|-bgcolor=ccffcc
| 5
| September 9
| Blackwater
| W 98–73
| Bolick, Malonzo (17)
| Jamie Malonzo (12)
| Robert Bolick (7)
| DHVSU Gym
| 2–3
|-bgcolor=ccffcc
| 6
| September 11
| Terrafirma
| W 104–84
| Garvo Lanete (18)
| Sidney Onwubere (9)
| Robert Bolick (8)
| DHVSU Gym
| 3–3
|-bgcolor=ccffcc
| 7
| September 12
| NLEX
| W 96–94
| Robert Bolick (26)
| Jamie Malonzo (14)
| Bolick, Malonzo (5)
| DHVSU Gym
| 4–3
|-bgcolor=ffcccc
| 8
| September 15
| TNT
| L 92–102 
| Paolo Taha (20) 
| Ferrer, Malonzo, Rike (6) 
| Robert Bolick (11) 
| DHVSU Gym
| 4–4
|-bgcolor=ffcccc
| 9
| September 17
| Magnolia
| L 89–90 
| Greg Slaughter (21)
| Paolo Taha (9) 
| Jamie Malonzo (7)
| DHVSU Gym
| 4–5
|-bgcolor=ccffcc
| 10
| September 19
| Rain or Shine
| W 91–88 (OT)
| Greg Slaughter (25)
| Jamie Malonzo (14)
| Robert Bolick (7)
| DHVSU Gym
| 5–5
|-bgcolor=ccffcc
| 11
| September 23
| Alaska
| W 122–94 
| Robert Bolick (22)
| Robert Bolick (13)
| Robert Bolick (13)
| DHVSU Gym
| 6–5

Playoffs

Bracket

Game log

|-bgcolor=ffcccc
| 1
| September 26
| San Miguel
| L 87–88
| Sean Anthony (17)
| Greg Slaughter (10)
| Robert Bolick (7) 
| DHVSU Gym
| 0–1
|-bgcolor=ffcccc
| 2
| September 30
| San Miguel
| L 95–100
| Greg Slaughter (27)
| Greg Slaughter (12)
| Robert Bolick (14) 
| DHVSU Gym
| 0–2

Governors' Cup

Eliminations

Standings

Game log

|-bgcolor=ffcccc
| 1
| December 8
| Alaska
| L 85–87
| Arwind Santos (23)
| Cameron Forte (15)
| Robert Bolick (9) 
| Ynares Sports Arena
| 0–1
|-bgcolor=ffcccc
| 2
| December 10
| NLEX
| L 115–120 (OT)
| Greg Slaughter (22)
| Cameron Forte (23)
| Robert Bolick (14) 
| Ynares Sports Arena
| 0–2
|-bgcolor=ffcccc
| 3
| December 12
| San Miguel
| L 88–91
| Robert Bolick (24)
| Jamie Malonzo (13)
| Robert Bolick (8) 
| Ynares Sports Arena
| 0–3
|-bgcolor=ffcccc
| 4
| December 17
| Barangay Ginebra
| L 82–108
| Robert Bolick (32)
| Greg Slaughter (15)
| Robert Bolick (6) 
| Smart Araneta Coliseum
| 0–4

|-bgcolor=ffcccc
| 5
| February 12, 2022
| Rain or Shine
| L 90–104
| Artis, Ferrer (23)
| Arwind Santos (13)
| Roi Sumang (6)
| Smart Araneta Coliseum
| 0–5
|-bgcolor=ccffcc
| 6
| February 17, 2022
| Meralco
| W 109–98
| Jamel Artis (26)
| Arwind Santos (10)
| Bolick, Sumang (6)
| Smart Araneta Coliseum
| 1–5
|-bgcolor=ccffcc
| 7
| February 24, 2022
| Magnolia
| W 103–101
| Jamel Artis (42)
| Jamel Artis (9)
| Jamel Artis (8)
| Ynares Center
| 2–5
|-bgcolor=ccffcc
| 8
| February 26, 2022
| Phoenix
| W 101–93
| Jamel Artis (29)
| Jamie Malonzo (16)
| Jerrick Balanza (6)
| Ynares Center
| 3–5

|-bgcolor=ccffcc
| 9
| March 2, 2022
| Blackwater
| W 116–103
| Robert Bolick (30)
| Arwind Santos (13)
| Jamel Artis (9)
| Smart Araneta Coliseum
| 4–5
|-bgcolor=ccffcc
| 10
| March 5, 2022
| Terrafirma
| W 124–117
| Jamel Artis (31)
| Jamie Malonzo (12)
| Robert Bolick (17)
| Smart Araneta Coliseum
| 5–5
|-bgcolor=ffcccc
| 11
| March 11, 2022
| TNT
| L 101–106 (OT)
| Jamel Artis (39)
| Jamie Malonzo (15)
| Robert Bolick (6)
| Smart Araneta Coliseum
| 5–6

Playoffs

Bracket

Game log

|-bgcolor=ffcccc
| 1
| March 13, 2022
| Phoenix Super LPG
| L 98–101
| Jamel Artis (21)
| Jamel Artis (12)
| Robert Bolick (7)
| Smart Araneta Coliseum
| 0–1

Transactions

Trades

Pre-season

Mid-season

Recruited imports

References

NorthPort Batang Pier seasons
NorthPort Batang Pier